The Secret of Wera Baranska (German: Das Geheimnis der Wera Baranska) is a 1919 German silent film directed by Eugen Burg, Franz Porten and Rosa Porten. It stars Wanda Treumann, Paul Hartmann, and Reinhold Schünzel.

Cast
 Wanda Treumann as Wera von Boranska 
 Paul Hartmann
 Reinhold Schünzel

References

Bibliography
 Bock, Hans-Michael & Bergfelder, Tim. The Concise CineGraph. Encyclopedia of German Cinema. Berghahn Books, 2009.

External links

1919 films
Films of the Weimar Republic
German silent feature films
Films directed by Eugen Burg
Films directed by Franz Porten
Films directed by Rosa Porten
German drama films
1919 drama films
German black-and-white films
Silent drama films
1910s German films
1910s German-language films